Weight-of-conflict conjecture was proposed by Glenn Shafer in his book on the Dempster–Shafer theory titled A Mathematical Theory of Evidence.

References

Further reading
 

Dempster–Shafer theory